Roeseler or Röseler is a surname. Notable people with the surname include:

 Larry Roeseler, American motorcycle racer
 Fritz Roeseler (1897–1985), American football player
 Nils Röseler (born 1992), German professional footballer

See also
 Rößler
 Rössler
 Roessler